Leon Pownall (April 26, 1943 – June 2, 2006) was a Welsh Canadian actor and director.

He was born in Wrexham, Wales and moved to Hamilton, Ontario with his family in 1957. He performed at the Stratford Festival during the 1960s and returned several times to the festival over the years to perform, the last time in 2002 as a director.

Pownall wrote and performed a one-man play, Do Not Go Gentle, about Dylan Thomas. Geraint Wyn Davies later performed this work off-Broadway in 2005 and at the Stratford Festival in 2010.

His film credits include Dead Poets Society (1989), in which he shared the screen with Robin Williams, as well as the title role in Handel's Last Chance (1996) and a supporting role in  the Golden Globe-winning Dirty Pictures (2000). Pownall was nominated for a Gemini Award for the role of Dr. Ewan Cameron in the 1998 Canadian television mini-series The Sleep Room. He also appeared in television series such as The Beachcombers, Street Legal, Wiseguy, and Slings & Arrows.

Pownall died on June 2, 2006, of cancer, in Stratford. He was 63 years old.

Filmography

References

External links
 

1943 births
2006 deaths
Canadian male stage actors
Canadian male film actors
Canadian male television actors
People from Wrexham
Male actors from Hamilton, Ontario
Welsh emigrants to Canada
Deaths from cancer in Ontario
Welsh male film actors
Welsh male television actors
Welsh male stage actors